Kraussella is a genus of grasshoppers in the family Acrididae, subfamily Gomphocerinae.

Species
Orthoptera Species File lists:
Kraussella amabile (Krauss, 1877)
Kraussella coerulipes (Karny, 1917)

In Mali, Kraussella amabile is eaten by the Dogon people.

References

Gomphocerinae
Acrididae genera
Orthoptera of Africa